Podarcis guadarramae is a species of lizard in the family Lacertidae. It is found in Spain and Portugal.

References

Podarcis
Endemic reptiles of the Iberian Peninsula
Lizards of Europe
Reptiles described in 1916
Taxa named by Eduardo Boscá